The Uetliberg railway line is a passenger railway line which runs from the central station in the Swiss city of Zürich through the city's western outskirts to the summit of the Uetliberg. The route serves as line S10 of the Zürich S-Bahn, with the Zürcher Verkehrsverbund's (ZVV's) standards zonal fares applying.

The line was opened in 1875 and electrified in 1923. In 1990 it was extended to its current terminus at Zürich HB SZU, beneath Zürich Hauptbahnhof. Today it is owned by the Sihltal Zürich Uetliberg Bahn, a company that also owns the Sihltal line, and operates other transport services.

The line has a maximum gradient of 7.9% and is the steepest standard gauge adhesion railway in Europe. It carries both leisure and local commuter traffic.

History 

The Uetliberg line was built by the Uetlibergbahn-Gesellschaft, which opened its line from Selnau station in Zürich to the summit of the Uetliberg mountain in 1875. In 1892 the Sihltal line was opened by another company, running from the Uetliberg line's Selnau station to Sihlwald.

In 1920 the Uetlibergbahn-Gesellschaft became bankrupt and was liquidated. Two years later the line was taken over by the Bahngesellschaft Zürich–Uetliberg (BZUe), and one year after that it  was electrified. The original electric rolling stock had many of the attributes of contemporary tramcars, and were designed to be regaugeable to metre gauge as there was a (never realised) plan to integrate the line with the Zürich tram network.

In 1932 the management of the Sihltal line took over the management of the Uetliberg line, but the two companies remained in existence until 1973, when they were merged to form the Sihltal Zürich Uetliberg Bahn.

In 1990, the two lines were extended from their previous joint terminus at Selnau to a terminus at Zürich HB. This extension involved the construction of a new rail tunnel from Selnau to Zurich HB, and a new underground intermediate station adjacent to the former terminus. The underground platform and tracks used at Zurich HB were already in existence, having been built prior to 1973 for a U-Bahn scheme that was ultimately rejected by voters. Once the new extension had been opened, the former terminus at Selnau was redeveloped and little evidence of it is now visible.

Until 2008, a train of the line's original 1923 rolling stock was kept as a museum train by the SZU. However an increase in train frequencies in that year meant that the possibilities of running the stock was much reduced, and depot capacity was at a premium. The train, made up of motor car 2 and trailer C41, has since been loaned to the Swiss Transport Museum in Lucerne.

A project to convert the line from 1200 V DC to 15 kV AC completed in August 2022.

Operation

Route 
The Uetliberg line shares a common terminus with the Sihltal line, utilising a dedicated underground island platform (tracks 21 and 22) at Zürich Hauptbahnhof station. There is no rail connection to the rest of the station, but the platform is served by the same complex of pedestrian subways and subterranean shopping malls that link the station's other platforms.

From Hauptbahnhof to Zürich Giesshübel station the two lines share a common twin-track line, initially in tunnel, partly running along and under the Sihl river. The current Selnau station is located in this under-river tunnel section.

Although the two lines diverge at Giesshübel station, and the depot for Uetliberg trains is located there, Uetliberg line trains do not stop. Just beyond Giesshübel, the line serves Zürich Binz station. This section of line is single track, with a double track section between Binz and Friesenberg.

Triemli station is adjacent to the Triemli Hospital, one of Zürich's main hospitals, and is the terminus for some trains on the line. The station previously had two tracks and two platforms. Due to accessibility requirements, the island platform and the second track were removed in 2018. 

This section of line serves Uitikon Waldegg and Ringlikon stations, and is single track, with double track sections between Triemli and Uitikon Waldegg, and at Ringlikon.

The station has two terminal tracks, and a substantial station building, including a restaurant.

Services 
 

The passenger services on the line now forms part of the Zürich S-Bahn, branded as the S10. Standard Zürcher Verkehrsverbund (ZVV) zonal fare tariffs apply to the line. On working days, trains run every 30 minutes from Hauptbahnhof to Uetliberg, with a more frequent shuttle service between Hauptbahnhof and Triemli. On Saturdays, Sundays and public holidays, trains run the full length of the line every 20 minutes. A journey over the full length of the line takes 20 minutes.

Infrastructure 
The Uetliberg line is constructed to standard gauge and uses overhead lines for electrification.

Prior to August 2022 the Uetliberg line used 1200 V DC. To allow both lines to operate over the shared section, the Uetliberg line used an overhead line offset from the centre of the track, and its cars were equipped with specially designed pantographs to collect from this.

Rolling stock 

The Uetliberg railway's DC electrification system requires its own fleet of DC equipped trains. Until about 2014 most of the trains were operated by three car sets, with two Be 4/4 motor coaches from the series 521–528 sandwiching a low floor intermediate trailer. The two older Be 8/8 cars 31 and 32, with no low floor access, were used for short workings, reversing at Triemli station.

In 2010, six new multiple unit trains were ordered from Stadler Rail, equipped for dual voltage operation so as to operate on both the Uetliberg and Sihltal lines. By August 2013, the first of these units was on trial on the Uetlibergbahn, and by May 2014 they were operating many of the line's services. The new trains are three-section articulated low-floor units, and are classified as Be 510. In 2016 rakes of two Be 510 work the trains to Uetliberg, the Be 4/4 521–528 sets having been relegated to the short working and the Be 8/8 sets having been scrapped in February 2016.

See also 

 List of steepest gradients on adhesion railways

References

External links 
 

Railway lines in Switzerland
Transport in the canton of Zürich
Transport in Zürich
Sihltal Zürich Uetliberg Bahn lines
15 kV AC railway electrification